Arundel ward was an electoral district of Liverpool City Council. It was created in 1953 from the Sefton Park East ward.
Its boundaries were changed for the 1973 elections and again for the 1980 elections.

In the Local Government Boundary Commission's Report on the 1980 reorganisation the proposed new boundaries for the ward were described as "Commencing at a point where Ullet Road meets Sefton Park Road, thence northwards along said road and Lodge Lane to the southern boundary of Smithdown Ward, thence southeastwarda along said boundary and the southern boundary of Picton Ward to the western boundary of Church Ward, thence southeastwards, southwestwards and southeastwards along said boundary to the road known as Queens Drive Mossley Hill, thence southwestwards along said road to Mossley Hill Drive, thence northwestwards along said drive to the road known as Croxteth Gate, thence northwards along said road to Ullet Road, thence southwestwards along said road to the point of commencement."

The ward was dissolved prior to the 2004 Liverpool City Council Elections and distributed into by the re-arranged Church and Picton wards; the reinstated St. Michael's ward and the new Greenbank ward.

Councillors

Election results

Elections of the 2000s

2003

2002

2000

Elections of the 1990s

1999

1998

1996

1995

1994

1992

1991

1990

Elections of the 1980s

1988

1987

1986

1984

1983

1982

1980

1979

Elections of the 1970s

1978

1976

1975

1973

1972

1971

1970

Elections of the 1960s

1969

1968

1967

1966

1965

1964

1963

1962

1961

1960

Elections of the 1950s

1959

1958

1957

1956

1955

1954

1953

References

Wards of Liverpool